Skankin' Pickle Live is a live album by American ska punk band Skankin' Pickle, released on Dill Records in 1995. 

Tracks 1-2 were recorded at 924 Gilman Street in Berkeley, California on September 2, 1995. Tracks 3-15 were recorded at The Phoenix Theater in Petaluma, California on March 3, 1995.

Skankin' Pickle Live features five bonus tracks from two other artists on the Dill Records roster: three tracks from Hawaiian ska/reggae band The Tantra Monsters, which later appeared on their self-titled 1996 album, and two from San Francisco ska-punk band The Rudiments, "Treadmill" from the 1995 Suicide Machines split Skank for Brains, and a then-unreleased cover of The Toyes' "Smoke Two Joints" (titled "Two Joints").

Track listing
All songs written by Skankin' Pickle except where otherwise noted.

"Hussein Skank" – 3:23
"Fakin' Jamaican" (Steve Devlin) – 2:11
"David Duke is Running 4 President" – 1:48
"Pabu Boy" – 1:19
"Asian Man" – 3:14
"Rotten Banana Legs" – 2:56
"I Missed The Bus" – 2:28
"I'm In Love With A Girl Name Spike" – 1:57
"Thick Ass Stout" – 4:51
"Anxiety Attack" – 2:49
"Ice Cube Korea Wants A Word With You" – 1:33
"Margaret Cho Show" – 1:39
"Little Brown Jug" (Joseph Winner) – 1:21
"Toothless & Grey" – 3:49
"Fights" – 3:21
Bonus track: "Beans and Rice" by the Tantra Monsters - 6:25
Bonus track: "Working Man" by the Tantra Monsters - 3:36
Bonus track: "Traffic" by the Tantra Monsters - 5:46
Dill Records advertisement - 0:34
Bonus track: "Treadmill" by The Rudiments - 3:40
Bonus track: "Two Joints" by The Rudiments - 5:40

Personnel
Lynette Knackstedt - guitar, vocals, lead vocals on tracks 6 and 14
Gerry Lundquist - slide trombone, vocals
Ian Miller - bass guitar, vocals
Lars Nylander - valve trombone, vocals
Mike "Bruce Lee" Park - saxophone, vocals, lead vocals on tracks 1-5, 7, 8, 10-12 and 15
Chuck Phelps - drums

Skankin' Pickle albums
1995 live albums